Šumarak is a village in Serbia. It is situated in the Kovin municipality, in the South Banat District, Vojvodina province.

Name
Other names of the village: Serbian Cyrillic: Шумарак, Hungarian: Emánueltelep.

Historical population

1948: 233
1953: 231
1961: 192
1971: 241
1981: 168
1991: 109

Ethnic groups 
According to the last census from 2011, the village was ethnically mixed and largest ethnic group in the village were Serbs.

According to the older census from 2002, the population of the village numbered 180 people, including 62 Hungarians (34.44%), 54 Serbs (30%), and others. In 2006, the population numbered 177 people.

References
Slobodan Ćurčić, Broj stanovnika Vojvodine, Novi Sad, 1996.

See also
List of places in Serbia
List of cities, towns and villages in Vojvodina

Populated places in Serbian Banat
Populated places in South Banat District
Kovin